Three Rivers may refer to:

Related to Pittsburgh, Pennsylvania, United States
The confluence of the Allegheny River and Monongahela River to form the Ohio River at Pittsburgh, Pennsylvania
A nickname for the Pittsburgh area and a phrase used commonly in local culture
Three Rivers Park in Pittsburgh
Three Rivers Heritage Trail in Pittsburgh and Allegheny County
Three Rivers Arts Festival, held in Pittsburgh
Pittsburgh Three Rivers Regatta
Three Rivers Classic, an ice hockey tournament
Three Rivers Stadium, a now demolished sports facility in Pittsburgh
Three Rivers Xplosion, a women's football team in Pittsburgh
Three Rivers Review, a literary magazine published by the University of Pittsburgh
Three Rivers Village School in Pittsburgh

Geography

Australia
Three Rivers Station, a pastoral lease in the Mid West of Western Australia
Three Rivers, Queensland, a locality in the Shire of Cloncurry

Canada
Trois-Rivières, a city formerly called Three Rivers
Trois-Rivières (electoral district), a federal electoral district in Quebec, formerly called Three Rivers
The Three Rivers (Prince Edward Island), the collective name for the Brudenell, Cardigan and Montague Rivers
Three Rivers, New Brunswick, a village
The historical collective name for the Petitcodiac River, the Memramcook River, and the Shepody Bay in New Brunswick

United Kingdom
 Three Rivers District, Hertfordshire
 Three Rivers Estuary, Carmarthen Bay

United States
 Three Rivers, California
 Three Rivers, Massachusetts
 Three Rivers, Michigan
 Three Rivers, New Mexico
 Three Rivers Park District, Minnesota
 Three Rivers, the region surrounding Muskogee, Oklahoma
 Three Rivers (Oregon), a river
 Three Rivers, Oregon, a census-designated place
 Three Rivers, Texas
 Three Rivers Petroglyph Site, a state park in New Mexico

Elsewhere
 Sanjiangyuan National Nature Reserve or Three Rivers Nature Reserve, Qinghai province, China, containing the headwaters of the Yellow, Yangtze, and Mekong Rivers
 Kiso Three Rivers, Japan, a river confluence
 Three Rivers Proper, a suburb of Vereeniging, Gauteng, South Africa
 Three Rivers East, a suburb of Vereeniging, Gauteng, South Africa

Businesses
 Three Rivers Casino and Resort, Oregon
 Three Rivers Computer Corporation, a defunct corporation
 Three Rivers Mall, Kelso, Washington
 Three Rivers Press, a book publisher

Education
 Three Rivers Community College (Connecticut), Norwich, Connecticut, United States
 Three Rivers Community College (Missouri), Poplar Bluff, Missouri, United States
 Three Rivers Academy Sixth Form College, Surrey, England, a junior college
 Three Rivers Academy, Trois-Rivières, Québec, Canada, a high school
 Three Rivers Academy, Surrey, England, a secondary school
 Three Rivers Academy Sixth Form College, Surrey, England, a junior college
 Three Rivers School District (disambiguation)
 Three Rivers Community Schools, a school district in Michigan, United States
 Three Rivers High School (disambiguation)
 Three Rivers Village School, Pittsburgh, Pennsylvania, United States

Other uses
 Federal Correctional Institution, Three Rivers
 Three Rivers Conference (disambiguation), athletics and activities conference in multiple states
 Three Rivers District (VHSL), Virginia, United States, a school sports conference
 The Three Rivers Regiment (12e Régiment blindé du Canada), a Canadian military unit
 Three Rivers Festival, Fort Wayne, Indiana, United States
 Three Rivers Fountain, Adelaide, South Australia
 Three Rivers Rambler, a tourist train in Knoxville, Tennessee
 Three Rivers (train), a discontinued Amtrak train
 Three Rivers (TV series), an American medical drama, debuted and cancelled in 2009
 Three Rivers, the working title for the 1993 film Striking Distance
 Three Rivers, a fictional suburb in the 1994 show My So-Called Life
 Three Rivers Fire, a 2021 fire in New Mexico

See also
 Three Rivers and St. Maurice, former electoral district in Canada
 Three Rivers East, a suburb of Vereeniging, Gauteng, South Africa
 Three Rivers Proper, a suburb of Vereeniging, Gauteng
 Three Parallel Rivers of Yunnan Protected Areas, Yunan Province, China, within the drainage basins of the Yangtze, Mekong, and Salween Rivers
 Trois-Rivières (disambiguation)
 Tres Rios (disambiguation)